A Show of Hands is a concert film released on VHS, Laserdisc and DVD by the Canadian rock band Rush. It documents a live concert performance by the band on their 1987-88 Hold Your Fire Tour. In 1989, the band released an audio album of the same name on vinyl LP, audiocassette, and compact disc. The video comprises an entirely different recording, and features a different track list.

Dates of release & formats
The VHS and Laserdisc versions were the original formats of release, both in 1989. They are both currently out-of-print.

In 2006, a DVD version of the original production, with its audio re-mastered in 5.1-channel Dolby Surround by Rush guitarist and co-producer Alex Lifeson, was released as part of the DVD box set, titled Rush Replay X 3. In 2007, the DVD version of A Show of Hands, as it was included in Replay X 3, was released as a single, stand-alone DVD.

Filming locations
The concert footage documented in A Show of Hands was filmed in Birmingham, UK.

Track listing 
 Intro
 "The Big Money"
 "Marathon"
 "Turn the Page"
 "Prime Mover"
 "Manhattan Project"
 "Closer to the Heart"
 "Red Sector A"
 "Force Ten"
 "Lock and Key" (laserdisc only)
 "Mission"
 "Territories"
 "YYZ" 
 "The Rhythm Method" (drum solo)
 "The Spirit of Radio"
 "Tom Sawyer"
 "2112 Overture"/"The Temples of Syrinx"/"La Villa Strangiato"/"In the Mood"
 (Credits)

"YYZ" is not listed on the DVD track list.

The DVD version of A Show of Hands contains the full program of the VHS version; "Lock and Key" appeared on the laserdisc version of A Show of Hands, but does not appear on the DVD or VHS versions. It was later included on a bonus disc in the R40 Box Set.

During the "La Villa Strangiato" section of the closing medley, Lifeson approaches his microphone and yells for several seconds. His words are silenced and a message appears onscreen telling viewers that his offensive speech has been censored. Lifeson actually said, "Singing is easy" and proceeded to make a series of strange random noises. Although the band has never confirmed what (if anything) Lifeson said, they have admitted that the censorship was a joke.

The songs "Subdivisions," "Limelight," "Time Stand Still," "Lock and Key,"  "Distant Early Warning," and "Red Lenses" were performed on the Hold Your Fire tour, but omitted from the video.

Personnel
Geddy Lee – bass guitar, synthesizers, vocals
Alex Lifeson – guitars, synthesizers, backing vocals
Neil Peart – acoustic and electronic percussion

Certifications

References

Show of Hands
1989 video albums
Live video albums
Rush (band) live albums
PolyGram video albums